Rugigegat is a genus of moths in the family Cossidae.

Species
 Rugigegat nigra (Moore, 1877)
 Rugigegat radzha Yakovlev, 2009

References

 , 2009: New taxa of African and Asian Cossidae (Lepidoptera). Euroasian Entomological Journal 8 (3): 353-361. Full article: .

External links
Natural History Museum Lepidoptera generic names catalog

Zeuzerinae